Chikhali may refer to several places in India:

Chikhali, Rajasthan, a village in Dungarpur district, Rajasthan

Maharashtra 
Chikhali Bk., a village in Pune district
Chikhali, Pune, a village in Pune district
Chikhali, Latur district, a village in Latur district
Chikhali, Ratnagiri district, a village in Ratnagiri district
Chikhali (Vidhan Sabha constituency), an Assembly constituency in Buldhana district

See also
Chikhli (disambiguation)